Puerto Rico Highway 124 (PR-124) is a rural road that connects from Lares to Las Marías.

Route description
It is a curvy road, which crosses the Río Grande de Añasco in barrio Espino (between Lares and Las Marías). Among its intersections are PR-111 (in Lares), PR-120 (to Maricao) and PR-119.

Major intersections

See also

 List of highways numbered 124

References

External links
 

124